The 2020 FIBA World Olympic Qualifying Tournaments for Women were the three women's basketball tournaments that were contested by 16 national teams, where the top teams earned a place in the 2020 Summer Olympics basketball tournament. It was held from 6 to 9 February 2020.

Format
The 16 teams were divided into four groups (Groups A–D) for the qualifying tournaments.

Hosts selection
The cities of Ostend, Bourges and Belgrade hosted the tournaments. Foshan was also selected, but due to concerns about the coronavirus pandemic it was relocated to Belgrade.

Squads

Teams

Draw
The draw took place at The House of Basketball in Mies, Switzerland on 27 November 2019. There were four World Olympic Qualifying Tournaments. Each tournament featured four teams, three of whom qualified for the Olympic Games. However, because the host nation and the World Cup winner were playing in the qualifying tournaments, the tournaments in which they played each awarded only two additional spots.

Seeding
The latest ranking before the draw served as the basis to determine the pots for the draw (seeding in brackets).

The following restrictions apply:
 Spain could not be drawn in the group hosted by another European country (Ostend, Bourges and Belgrade)
 Australia could not be drawn in the group hosted by another Asian/Oceania country (Foshan)
 Japan could not be drawn in the group with the US, Australia or China
 Brazil could not be drawn in the group with the USA or Canada
 Mozambique had to be drawn in the group with Nigeria
 Sweden could not be drawn with two European teams

Qualifying tournaments

Ostend

Bourges

Belgrade – Group A

Belgrade – Group B

The tournament was moved from Foshan, China to Belgrade, Serbia due to concerns about the coronavirus pandemic.

See also
 2020 FIBA Men's Olympic Qualifying Tournaments
 Basketball at the 2020 Summer Olympics

References

 
FIBA World Olympic Qualifying Tournament for Women
Qual
2020 in women's basketball
2019–20 in Belgian basketball
International basketball competitions hosted by Belgium
Sport in Ostend
2019–20 in Serbian basketball
International women's basketball competitions hosted by Serbia
International sports competitions in Belgrade
2019–20 in French basketball
International women's basketball competitions hosted by France
Sport in Cher (department)
basketball
FIBA
FIBA
Impact of the COVID-19 pandemic on the 2020 Summer Olympics